The Diocese of Tagbilaran is one of the 72 ecclesiastical territories called dioceses of the Catholic Church in the Philippines. It is one of 2 dioceses in the province of Bohol and is part of the ecclesiastical province of the Cebu. The Diocese of Tagbilaran was established on November 8, 1941.

History 

The Diocese of Tagbilaran was created on November 8, 1941 and made a suffragan of the Archdiocese of Cebu by the apostolic constitution In sublimi Petri cathedra. But due to the complications caused by World War II, its first bishop, Julio Rosales, a priest of the Diocese of Palo took possession of the diocese after his episcopal consecration 5 years after Tagbilaran's erection. On January 9, 1986, the diocese lost half of its territory and Pope John Paul II created the Diocese of Talibon with seat in Talibon, a major town on the northern coast of the island. The Diocese of Talibon absorbed half of the civil province of Bohol. The Cathedral of the Diocese of Tagbilaran was declared as a Diocesan Shrine and it will be called “Cathedral Shrine – Parish of Saint Joseph the Worker”.

Bishops of Tagbilaran

See also

 Diocese of Talibon
 Archdiocese of Cebu
 Immaculate Heart of Mary Seminary
 Singing Priests of Tagbilaran
 List of the Roman Catholic dioceses of the Philippines

References

External links
 The official Website of Tagbilaran Diocese
 Bishop Leonardo Medroso Blogspot
 Diocesan Commission on Youth-Diocese of Tagbilaran 

Diocese of Tagbilaran
Tagbilaran
Tagbilaran
Tagbilaran
Roman Catholic dioceses and prelatures established in the 20th century
Religion in Bohol